An Election to the Edinburgh Corporation was held on 1 May 1962, alongside municipal elections across Scotland. Of the councils 69 seats, 23 were up for election.

After the election Edinburgh Corporation was composed of 34 Progressives, 30 Labour councillors, and 5 Liberals. The Progressives lost their overall majority on the council.

Aggregate results

Ward Results

References

City of Edinburgh Council elections
Edinburgh